Michael Lachanodrakon (died 20 July 792) was a distinguished Byzantine general and fanatical supporter of Byzantine Iconoclasm under Emperor Constantine V. As a result of his iconoclast zeal, in 766 he rose to high office as governor of the Thracesian Theme, and instigated a series of repressive measures against iconophile practices, particularly targeting the monasteries. A talented general, he also led a series of campaigns against the Arabs of the Abbasid Caliphate before being dismissed from office in about 782. Restored to imperial favour in 790, he fell at the Battle of Marcellae against the Bulgars in 792.

Persecution of the iconophiles

Nothing is known of Lachanodrakon's origins and early life. He receives a very negative treatment in the historical sources, which were written after the final defeat of Byzantine Iconoclasm; some refer to him solely as ho Drakon ("the Dragon", alluding to his surname and the Biblical Beast). Their profoundly iconophile perspective means that reports of his actions, especially those relating to the suppression of icon worship, are potentially untrustworthy.

At the Council of Hieria in 754, Constantine V had declared the adoration of icons to be a heresy, and had thereby elevated iconoclasm to official imperial policy. No persecution of iconophiles was launched at first, but iconophile resistance grew, until from 765 on, Constantine began persecuting iconophiles, and especially monks. The discovery of a wide-ranging iconophile plot against him involving some of the highest civil and military officials of the state in 766 provoked an extreme reaction. Patriarch Constantine II and other officials were deposed, jailed, publicly humiliated, and finally executed, replaced by new, uncompromisingly iconoclast officials. In addition, the veneration of sacred relics and prayers to the saints and the Virgin Mary were condemned.

By 763 or 764, according to the iconophile Life of St Stephen the Younger hagiography, Lachanodrakon had already distinguished himself by his iconoclast fervour. On the emperor's orders, he led a group of soldiers on an invasion of the Pelekete monastery on the Propontis, where he arrested 38 monks and subjected the remainder to various tortures and mutilations. After burning down the monastery, he took the 38 captives to Ephesus, where they were executed. In 766/767, as part of the emperor's reshuffle of the senior echelons of the Byzantine Empire, Lachanodrakon was rewarded with the important post of strategos (military governor) of the Thracesian Theme, and given the rank of patrikios and imperial protospatharios according to his seal. He soon began a harsh repression of the monasteries and iconophiles. According to Theophanes the Confessor, in 769/770 he summoned the monks and nuns of his theme to Ephesus, gathered them in the city's tzykanisterion and forced them to marry, threatening them with blinding and exile to Cyprus if they refused. Although many resisted and "became martyrs" in Theophanes's words, many complied. Later reports of exiled monks in Cyprus becoming Arab captives seem to partly corroborate this story. Theophanes reports further that in 771/772, Lachanodrakon dissolved all monasteries in the theme, confiscated and expropriated their property, and sent the proceeds to the emperor, who replied with a letter thanking him for his zeal. Lachanodrakon allegedly had relics, holy scriptures, and monks' beards set on fire, killed or tortured those who venerated relics, and finally prohibited the tonsure. Although highly embellished, these reports probably reflect actual events. At any rate, by 772, according to historian Warren Treadgold, Lachanodrakon seems to have succeeded in "eradicating monasticism within his theme".

Military activities

Lachanodrakon was also a capable general, winning fame for his campaigns against the Abbasids on the Byzantine Empire's eastern frontier. During the reign of Constantine V's son Leo IV he seems to have been the most prominent military commander, repeatedly leading expeditions comprising troops from several themes against the Arabs. 

The first such expedition occurred in 778 when, preempting an anticipated Arab raid, Lachanodrakon led a large army against Germanikeia. Although the city did not fall (Theophanes claims that the Arab commander bribed Lachanodrakon), the Byzantine army defeated a relief force, plundered the region, and took many captives, mostly Jacobites, who were then resettled in Thrace. In 780, Lachanodrakon ambushed and defeated an Arab invasion in the Armeniac Theme, killing the brother of the Arab commander Thumama ibn al-Walid. The Arab historian al-Tabari records that in 781 Lachanodrakon forced another Arab invasion, under 'Abd al-Kabir, to withdraw without battle, although Theophanes ascribes the success to the sakellarios John. In 782, however, he was defeated by the Arab general al-Barmaqi during a large-scale invasion led by the future caliph Harun al-Rashid, losing some 15,000 men according to Theophanes. In the aftermath of this defeat, and likely because of his iconoclast past, he was apparently removed from his command by the iconophile empress-regent Irene of Athens.

Lachanodrakon reappears in 790, when the young emperor Constantine VI conspired to overturn the tutelage of Irene. The general was sent by Constantine to the Armeniac Theme to secure the allegiance of its soldiers. Constantine succeeded in toppling his mother in December 790; it was probably then that Lachanodrakon was rewarded with the supreme non-imperial title, that of magistros. According to the account of Theophanes, he participated in the imperial campaign against the Bulgars in 792 that led to the disastrous defeat at the Battle of Marcellae on 20 July, where he was killed. The history of John Skylitzes records his death in the Battle of Versinikia, again against the Bulgars, in 813, but this is clearly an error.

References

Sources

8th-century births
792 deaths
8th-century Byzantine people
Byzantine generals
Byzantine Iconoclasm
Byzantines killed in battle
Patricii
Byzantine people of the Arab–Byzantine wars
Byzantine people of the Byzantine–Bulgarian Wars
Magistroi
Governors of the Thracesian Theme